Thanatophilus lapponicus, the northern carrion beetle, is a species of carrion beetle in the family Silphidae. It is found in Europe and Northern Asia (excluding China), Central America, and North America.

References

Further reading

External links

 

Silphidae
Articles created by Qbugbot
Beetles described in 1793